Dayseeker is an American post-hardcore band from Orange County, California, United States. The band is currently signed to Spinefarm Records.

History

Formation and debut album What It Means to Be Defeated (2012-2014)
Dayseeker was formed in 2012 by vocalist Rory Rodriguez, guitarists Alex Polk and Gino Sgambelluri, bassist Andrew Sharp and drummer Mike Karle in Orange near San Diego, California. Rory Rodriguez and Alex Polk were members in a band called Arms Like Yours before forming Dayseeker.

The band released a series of demos including the songs "What It Means to Be Defeated", "Collision.Survive" and "Resurrect", which were released on their debut record as well as two untitled songs. On July 7, 2013, the band was signed to inVogue Records, which released their debut album What It Means to Be Defeated on October 29, 2013. It featured work by Joey Sturgis, who mastered the record. On November 24, 2014, the album was re-released. Tom Denney, a former guitarist of A Day to Remember was involved in producing the re-released version of the album. The re-issue features three acoustic tracks.

In November and December 2013 the band toured the United States on a three-week tour alongside Kingdom of Giants. In April and May 2014 the band was part of the Artery Across the Nation Tour, which featured Upon This Dawning and The Browning in the line-up.

Origin (2014-2016)
On December 23, 2014, the band announced they would be a part of the Hawthorne Heights tour between March and April 2015. After that tour, the band then shared the stage with Silent Planet in April and May 2015 to promote Origin.

In January 2015, the band announced they were to begin recording the follow-up to their debut album What It Means to Be Defeated with producer Nick Ingram, who had worked with Hotel Books and Before Their Eyes in the past. On March 9, 2015, it was announced that the album was entitled Origin and would be released on April 21, 2015. The same day the same-titled lead single as well as the pre-orders were announced, the band released a cover of Nick Jonas' song "Jealous".

Departure from InVogue and Dreaming Is Sinking / Waking Is Rising (2016-2018)
The band members Alex Polk and Andrew Sharp departed from the band in the spring of 2016. Shawn Yates, former member of At the Skylines, served as the new guitarist. On December 15, 2016, the band announced their departure from InVogue Records and that they had signed with Spinefarm Records. Shortly after, they announced a US tour with headliner Silent Planet, along with Ghost Key and Hail the Sun, which began in February 2017. A year after the release of Origin, Dayseeker announced a new full-length album set to release in 2017. The album, Dreaming Is Sinking / Waking Is Rising, was released by Spinefarm on July 14, 2017.

Sleeptalk (2019-2021)
On September 27, 2019, Dayseeker released their fourth full-length album entitled Sleeptalk. Just before its two-year anniversary, Sleeptalk: Deluxe was released, including stripped-down "reimagined" versions of the first four songs: Drunk, Crooked Soul, Burial Plot, and Sleeptalk.

In the fall of 2021, Oh, Sleeper drummer Zac Mayfield announced that he would be temporarily filling in for Mike Karle for the foreseeable future. Karle returned to the group the following fall.

Neon Grave and Dark Sun (2022-present)
On March 25, 2022, Dayseeker released the song Neon Grave. Rodriguez confirmed the progress on a new album, stating that he has found himself immersed in the emotions that came with the loss of his father shortly after his daughter's unexpected birth. In an interview with Boolin Tunes, Rodriguez revealed that he initially intended to only write one song about his grief and then 'move on,' but it quickly grew to engulf the writing sessions and he knew that it would take the majority an album to properly represent his emotions. From that came Dark Sun, which released on November 4th.

Members
Current members
Rory Rodriguez – lead vocals (2012–present)
Gino Sgambelluri – guitar, backing vocals (2012–present)
Ramone Valerio – bass, backing vocals (2017–present)
Mike Karle – drums, percussion (2012–present; hiatus 2021–present)

Past members
Andrew Sharp – bass (2012–2016)
Alex Polk – guitar (2012–2016)
Matt Steenstra – guitar (2012)
Shawn Yates – guitar (2016–2018)

Touring members
Zac Mayfield – drums, percussion (2021–2022)

Timeline

Discography

Albums

Singles

Collaborations

Music videos

References

External links
 Dayseeker on Facebook

2012 establishments in California
Musical groups established in 2012
American post-hardcore musical groups
Metalcore musical groups from California